Gnarrk is a fictional character in DC Comics. He is a caveman who has been a member of various versions of the Teen Titans in the comic books in the early 1970s.

Fictional character biography

Pre-Crisis
Prior to the Crisis on Infinite Earths, Gnarrk was a time displaced Neanderthal stranded in the present. Through love and telepathic communication, Lilith teaches him human language and customs. Later, both retire from the Teen Titans to live together, apparently as a couple. Later, Gnarrk and Lilith briefly joined Teen Titans West before it disbanded. Several years later at Donna Troy's wedding, Lilith mentioned Gnarrk's "terrible fate", but didn't elaborate on it. The readers never found out what Gnarrk's final fate was in Pre-Crisis.

Post-Crisis
Gnarrk's story began thousands of years ago. Gnarrk was a nineteen-year-old Cro-Magnon who was fascinated by the lights in the skies. One night, a comet crashed before him, embedding a chunk of crystal into his chest. Somehow, this caused a transformation in him — it expanded his mind and his understanding.

Soon, a volcanic disturbance threatened Gnarrk. The jewel in his chest protected him by encasing him in ice. Centuries passed, and Gnarrk remained in his ice tomb. During that time, his mind still worked, and Gnarrk dreamed of a better world. He used his abilities to cure disease and control the forces of nature to benefit mankind.

Based on psychic flashes from Lilith, the Teen Titans traveled to Southeast Asia, where they eventually found Gnarrk still encased in ice. He sensed Lilith's presence and called out to her. Lilith used her powers to establish a mental rapport with Gnarrk. He told her his name, and she found out his true origins and his noble intentions. Although Lilith was dating Don Hall (Dove) at the time, she nonetheless found herself attracted to the gentle soul.

The Titans brought Gnarrk back to S.T.A.R. Labs. It was established that he was dying. The S.T.A.R. scientists wanted to dissect him, but the Titans prevented them from doing so.

Gnarrk remained on life support for almost a year with Lilith by his side. Gnarrk's light in his chest eventually faded, and he died. When S.T.A.R. scientists performed an autopsy, they found the stone no longer had any special abilities. Whatever abilities the stone possessed vanished upon Gnarrk's death.

The New 52
Gnarrk is a member of the original incarnation of the Teen Titans. Nothing is known about his past or origins, though Gnarrk is shown fully integrated into society when he meets Roy Harper, when the two meet. Along with Hank Hall and Dawn Granger, Roy and Gnarrk are met by Lilith. Lilith explains how they were the original Teen Titans and how she was forced to erase their memories of their group and each other, to protect them after their souls became entangled with an occult ritual conducted by Mr. Twister.

During the Heroes in Crisis storyline, Gnarrk has checked into Sanctuary. He is among the heroes who are killed in an unexpected attack.

Powers and abilities
Being a Cro-Magnon, Gnarrk possesses greater strength, dexterity, and endurance. When a comet embedded a chunk of crystal into his chest, it caused a transformation in Gnarrk where it expanded his mind, and his understanding. The full range of his expanded mental abilities were uncatalogued.

In other media
 Gnarrk appeared in Teen Titans, voiced by Dee Bradley Baker. This version lives in a vast series of Arctic caverns inhabited by prehistoric creatures with his best friend, Kole, and suffers from technophobia due to bad experiences in the modern world. Despite only being capable of saying his name, she can understand and communicate with him. Following an encounter with the Teen Titans and Doctor Light, Gnarrk and Kole become honorary members of the group and later go on to help them defeat the Brotherhood of Evil.
 The Teen Titans animated series incarnation of Gnarrk appears in Teen Titans Go! issue #32.

References

Characters created by Bob Haney
Characters created by George Tuska
Comics characters introduced in 1971
DC Comics characters with superhuman strength
DC Comics superheroes
Fictional characters with superhuman durability or invulnerability
Fictional prehistoric characters